Pterostichus melanarius, the Rain-Beetle,  is a species of ground beetle native to Europe.

References

Pterostichus
Beetles described in 1798
Beetles of Europe